The Hannibal Islands are a group of small islands in the Shelburne Bay in the far north of Queensland, Australia about 100 km north of Cape Grenville, Cape York Peninsula in the Great Barrier Reef Marine Park.

The islands are a part of the East Islands group about 10 km from Captain Billy Landing. The islands were named by Phillip Parker King in 1819 after his brother in law Hannibal Macarthur.

Islands on the Great Barrier Reef
Islands of Far North Queensland
Uninhabited islands of Australia
Places in the Great Barrier Reef Marine Park